The selection process for the 1932 Winter Olympics consisted of nine bids. It saw Lake Placid, United States, be selected ahead of candidates Yosemite Valley, Lake Tahoe, Bear Mountain, Duluth, Minneapolis and Denver, Oslo, and Montreal, Quebec. The selection was made at the 27th IOC Session in Lausanne, Switzerland, on 10 April 1929.

References

Bids
 
20th century in Lausanne
Events in Lausanne
May 1929 events
1929 in Switzerland